Sir George Errington, 1st Baronet (1839 – 19 March 1920) was an Irish Home Rule League politician.

He was elected a Member of Parliament (MP) for Longford in 1874 and held the seat until it was abolished in 1885.

Errington was created the 1st Baronet of Lackham Manor in 1885, but upon his death the title became extinct.

Arms

References

External links
 

1839 births
1920 deaths
Home Rule League MPs
Members of the Parliament of the United Kingdom for County Longford constituencies (1801–1922)
UK MPs 1874–1880
UK MPs 1880–1885
Baronets in the Baronetage of the United Kingdom